Carex heleonastes is a species of flowering plant belonging to the family Cyperaceae.

Its native range is Europe to Russian Far East, Canada.

References

heleonastes